Tradebot Systems, Inc. is one of the larger high-frequency equity trading firms in the US. Based in Kansas City, Missouri, they regularly account for 5% of the total trading volume in the US stock market.  According to the founder, Dave Cummings, as of 2008, the firm "typically held stocks for 11 seconds", and "had not had a losing day in 4 years". That streak continued uninterrupted until 2018.

The firm was founded in 1999 and had an early relationship with fellow high-frequency trading shop Getco. In 2005 Cummings left Tradebot to start a new electronic market, which he called the Better Alternative Trading System. That market eventually became the BATS stock exchange. In 2007 Cummings left BATS to return to Tradebot. The firm is affiliated with Tradebot Ventures, Tradebot Properties,  Tatora and Auxby.

In summer 2014, New York Attorney General Eric Schneiderman accused Barclays of hiding that Tradebot was one of the largest participants in their dark pool. Tradebot was not accused of any wrongdoing.

References

Companies based in Kansas City, Missouri